The Frederic A. Duggan, First Aid and Emergency Squad Building is located in Spring Lake, Monmouth County, New Jersey, United States. The building was constructed in 1934 and added to the National Register of Historic Places on September 18, 1998.

The building was actively utilized by the Spring Lake First Aid and Emergency Squad until 2004, when the Squad moved out to a larger building in the same street. While in use, it was the oldest first aid squad building in the country. It was remodeled after being vacated, and reopened in 2015 as a community building.

See also
National Register of Historic Places listings in Monmouth County, New Jersey

References

Government buildings on the National Register of Historic Places in New Jersey
Buildings and structures completed in 1934
Buildings and structures in Monmouth County, New Jersey
Tudor Revival architecture in New Jersey
National Register of Historic Places in Monmouth County, New Jersey
New Jersey Register of Historic Places
Spring Lake, New Jersey
1934 establishments in New Jersey